Real Country: Music and Language in Working-Class Culture is a  book by Columbia University musicologist Aaron Fox.

It was published by Duke University Press in 2004.

References

Further reading
 
 
 
 
 
 
 

1992 non-fiction books